Broadcast Film Critics Association Awards 2003 may refer to:

 8th Critics' Choice Awards, the eighth Critics' Choice Awards ceremony that took place in 2003
 9th Critics' Choice Awards, the ninth Critics' Choice Awards ceremony that took place in 2004 and which honored the best in film for 2003